The London, Midland and Scottish Railway (LMS) Fowler 2-6-2T was a class of steam locomotive. The LMS classified them 3P, BR 3MT. All were built at Derby Works between 1930 and 1932. William Stanier used them to form the basis for the LMS Stanier 2-6-2T, which was essentially a taper boilered version.

Numbering 
They were initially numbered 15500–15569, but from 1934 were renumbered 1–70. After nationalisation in 1948 British Railways added 40000 on to their numbers to number them 40001–70.

Variations
Numbers 15520–39 (later 21–40 and 40021–40) were fitted with condensing apparatus to work around London. Some of the non-condensing ones were fitted with vacuum operated pull and push control.

Withdrawal
All were withdrawn between 1959 and 1962.  None were preserved.

References

External links 

 Class 3P-A Details at Rail UK

3 Fowler 2-6-2T
2-6-2T locomotives
Railway locomotives introduced in 1930
Condensing steam locomotives
Scrapped locomotives
Standard gauge steam locomotives of Great Britain